Valebø is a village in the municipality of Skien, Norway. It is located on the eastern shore of Norsjø. On the opposite side of the lake lies Ulefoss.

From 1837 Valebø was administratively a part of Holla. On 1 January 1964, Valebø became a part of Skien municipality whereas the rest of Holla merged with Lunde to form the new municipality Nome. At that time Valebø had 259 inhabitants.

Villages in Vestfold og Telemark